Chitranjali is a film production studio located in Thiruvananthapuram, Kerala, India. It was established in 1980s by the Kerala State Film Development Corporation (KSFDC).

The studio has four outdoor film units, film processing labs, dubbing studios, preview theatres etc.
There was a revamp proposal of Rs. 100 crore by the government. The proposal was part of the corporation's initiative to facilitate the growth of Malayalam cinema.

Filmography
Aadhyathe Katha (1972)

References 

Mass media in Thiruvananthapuram
Film production companies of Kerala
1980s establishments in Kerala
Mass media companies established in the 1980s
Year of establishment missing